Chanaresuchus is an extinct genus of proterochampsian archosauriform. It was of modest size for a proterochampsian, being on average just over a meter in length. Fossils are known from the Middle and Late Triassic of La Rioja Province, Argentina and Rio Grande do Sul (geoparque Paleorrota), Brazil. The type species and only currently known species is Chanaresuchus bonapartei was named from the Ladinian-age Chañares Formation in 1971. A second species C. ischigualastensis named in 2012 from the late Carnian-age Ischigualasto Formation, was briefly assigned to Chanaresuchus before being moved to its own genus Pseudochampsa in 2014. C. bonapartei has recently been found in the Carnian Santa Maria Formation in Brazil. Chanaresuchus appears to be one of the most common archosauriforms from the Chanares Formation due to the abundance of specimens referred to the genus. Much of the material has been found by the La Plata-Harvard expedition of 1964-65. Chanaresuchus was originally classified in the family Proterochampsidae, although it has been placed in the family Rhadinosuchidae in more recent studies (both families belong to the larger group Proterochampsia).

Description
Chanaresuchus has a low, elongate skull that is characteristic of proterochampsians. The skull is quite broad posteriorly with a narrow snout, varying in length from around 165mm to 260mm in the largest individuals. The nares are slit-like and positioned away from the tip of the rostrum, farther up the skull. The premaxilla is slightly down-curved. The skull table is highly ornamented in larger specimens, with the dermal bones well sculptured. The palate of Chanaresuchus has two elongate choanae. Two small openings anterior to the choanae may be anterior palatine foramina that could have been used for access to vomeronasal organs. The secondary palate formed between these two sets of openings may have been an adaptation for breathing through the snout while underwater.

Unlike other proterochampsians and early archosaurs, Chanaresuchus had little body armor. The only osteoderms found are small and scale-like, forming a single row down the back. They run from the neck to the hip, ending at the last presacral vertebra. They most likely continue down the tail, although tail osteoderms are not preserved in any specimens. There are roughly three osteoderms overlying each vertebra.

The foot of Chanaresuchus differs from other related archosaurs in that the inner toes are inlarged, whereas other primitive archosaurs retain a more symmetrical pattern. The first digit is reduced but robust, the second digit is the thickest, and the third digit is the longest, although somewhat slender in comparison to the others. The fourth digit is very slim and the fifth consists of only a metatarsal spur.

Paleobiology
A semiaquatic lifestyle similar to phytosaurs and modern day crocodilians has been proposed for Chanaresuchus, as is suggested by the secondary palate and upward facing orbits and nostrils. However, some evidence, such as a lack of aquatic amphibians found from the Chañares Formation, suggests that the area was relatively dry during the time of deposition. A terrestrial lifestyle is possible for the genus, as extreme differences in the size of the forelimbs relative to the hind limbs in comparison to other "thecodonts" may be considered a characteristic of bipedalism. However, this is most likely not the case for Chanaresuchus, and the evidence still remains in favor of a semiaquatic animal.

The depositional environment of the locality from which specimens of Chanaresuchus have been found was in close proximity to an area of high volcanic activity, because it was in an active rift basin. It is thought that all of the recovered specimens had died in a single event of mass mortality and may have been buried on a fluvial strandline. The mortality-causing event was most likely linked to regional volcanic activity.

The locality from which specimens of C. bonapartei have been found is well known for its abundance of tetrapods. Theraspids include the dicynodont Dinodontosaurus, and cynodonts such as Probainognathus and Massetognathus, the latter being the most abundant taxon of the locality. However, the most common group of tetrapods present from the formation are the archosaurs. Ornithodirans include Lewisuchus, Lagerpeton, Marasuchus, and Pseudolagosuchus. Other archosaurs include Gracilisuchus and Luperosuchus. Another proterochampsian, which was named alongside Chanaresuchus in 1971, is Gualosuchus. It is very similar in appearance to Chanaresuchus, differing only in size and cranial proportions.

References

External links 
 Chanaresuchus in the Paleobiology Database

Proterochampsians
Prehistoric reptile genera
Middle Triassic reptiles of South America
Late Triassic reptiles of South America
Triassic Argentina
Fossils of Argentina
 
Santa Maria Formation
Triassic Brazil
Fossils of Brazil
Fossil taxa described in 1971
Taxa named by Alfred Romer